The Turkish Republic Railways (TCDD) 46201 Class is a class of ex-USATC Lend-Lease S200 Class 2-8-2 steam locomotives.

Overview 
The USATC S200 Class was an American-designed locomotive which they lent-leased to the British for use in the Middle East.  The first 29 locomotives, Nos. 46201–29 were delivered to the Turks in 1943.  All were coal-burners. The Allies wanted to ensure that the Turks had efficient railway network should their supply lines extend through Turkey, while keeping neutral Turkey friendly towards them.  Nazi Germany meanwhile also supplied DRG BR 52-type Kriegsloks to the Turks in 1943 which formed the 56501 Class.

After the war, TCDD acquired 24 more engines, Nos. 46230–53, which were mostly oil-burners.  The Turks also obtained ex-USATC S160 Class 2-8-0s which formed the 45171 Class.

Preservation 
Two have been preserved, 46244 at Çamlık Railway Museum and 46224 at the TCDD Open Air Steam Locomotive Museum in Ankara.

External links 
 46201 to 46253 Trains of Turkey

46201 class
2-8-2 locomotives
Steam locomotives of Turkey
ALCO locomotives
Baldwin locomotives
Lima locomotives
Standard gauge locomotives of Turkey